David White is a former professional rugby league footballer who played in the 2000s. He played at club level for Stanley Rangers, in 2000's Super League V for Wakefield Trinity Wildcats  (Heritage № 1168), and Oulton Raiders of the National Conference League.

References

Living people
Place of birth missing (living people)
English rugby league players
Wakefield Trinity players
Year of birth missing (living people)